Actias philippinica is a moth in the family Saturniidae. It is found in the Philippines. It is very similar in appearance to Actias isis.

Subspecies
 Actias philippinica philippinica Nässig & Treadaway, 1997 (Philippines: Luzon)
 Actias philippinica bulosa Nässig & Treadaway, 1997 (Philippines: Palawan)

References

Philippinica
Moths described in 1997
Moths of Asia